Lala's Spa is a Colombian telenovela that premiered on Canal RCN on 6 April 2021, and ended on 2 August 2021. It is the first telenovela starring a transgender actress. The plot revolves around Lala Jiménez, a young and beautiful woman who has returned from Paris to Colombia to help her mother with her debts, but on her return falls in love with Francisco, a businessman who by circumstances of life is involved in a legal problems.

According to Kantar Ibope Media, the telenovela averaged a total of 6.79 rating points during its premiere.

Cast

Main 
 Isabella Santiago as Lala Jiménez
 Ricardo Mejía as Francisco Ponce de León
 Luly Bossa as Doña Nelcy
 Mauricio Vélez as Javier Villegas «El Zar del Lulo»
 Cony Camelo as Cristina Castillo
 Carlos Hurtado as Felipe Gallego
 Zulma Rey as Ingrid Tatiana Chávez
 Diana Belmonte as Mayerly «Mayo» Escocia
 Ernesto Ballén as Kevin Pinto
 Víctor David Tarazona as Juan Camilo Platz
 Álvaro Córdova as Plinio McArthur
 Michelle Rouillard as Carla Mendoza
 Paola Moreno as Raquel "Raquelita" Jaramillo
 Fernando Arévalo as Don Salomón
 Aco Pérez as Juan Carlos Troncoso «Juancho»

Recurring 
 Danielle Arciniegas as Genoveva Rubio
 Kristina Lilley as Lucía Ponce de León
 Coraima Torres as María Claudia
 Tatiana Ariza as Valentina Rincón
 Alejandro Gutiérrez as Fiscal Alberto Rodríguez Malo
 Jairo Soto as Don Olegario
 Pacho Rueda as Tribú
 Carlos Carvajal as Martín Ponce de León
 Pedro Suárez as Moncada
 Diego León Ospina as Ceferino
 Javier Gnecco Jr as Fernando Rubio
 Ángel de Miguel as Manolo Borbón
 Daniel Rocha as Barry Lafuente
 Paula Barreto as Brenda Hoyos Llano

Episodes

Los BFF (2021) 
On 8 April 2021, RCN Televisión announced the premiere of a web series in parallel to Lala's Spa entitled Los BFF. The series premiered on 15 April 2021 through Canal RCN, and the channel's official YouTube account. The plot revolves around the adventures and anecdotes of Francisco (Ricardo Mejía) and Juan C. Platz (Víctor David Tarazona).

References

External links 
 

2021 telenovelas
RCN Televisión telenovelas
Colombian telenovelas
Spanish-language telenovelas
Colombian LGBT-related television shows
2021 Colombian television series debuts
Transgender-related television shows
2020s LGBT-related drama television series
2021 Colombian television series endings